Allason is a surname. Notable people with the surname include:

James Allason OBE (1912–2011), British Conservative Party politician, sportsman, and former military planner who worked with Mountbatten and Churchill
Rupert Allason (born 1951), military historian and former Conservative Party politician in the United Kingdom
Thomas Allason (1790–1852), English architect, surveyor and landscaper, noted for his work at Connaught Square and the Ladbroke Estate in Kensington
Tom Allason, founder of Ecourier, a UK courier service
Walter Allason DSO (1875–1960), award-winning swimmer, diver, Brigadier-General and World War I hero.

See also
Alazon
Alison (disambiguation)
Allison (disambiguation)
Allyson
Alyson